Skeiðin is a mountain above the village of Sørvágur in the Faroe Islands. It lies between the village itself and the bay of Selvík. On the top of the mountain is a radio transmitter.

Mountains of the Faroe Islands